Leonardo Puñales Bonilla, commonly known as Leonardo Puñales is a team handball coach from Uruguay. He currently coaches the Uruguay women's national handball team.

He participated at the 2011 World Women's Handball Championship in Brazil and at 2011 Pan American Games in Mexico.

References

Living people
Uruguayan handball coaches
Year of birth missing (living people)